Northern Rockies Regional Airport (Fort Nelson Airport)  is located  east northeast of Fort Nelson, British Columbia, Canada.

Airlines and destinations

History
The aerodrome was listed as "Under Construction - Servicable" with two runways listed as follows:

Historical airline service
Commencing during the early 1940s, scheduled passenger service was operated in the past by Canadian Pacific Air Lines and its successors CP Air and Canadian Airlines International to Vancouver, British Columbia; Edmonton, Alberta; Prince George, British Columbia; Fort St. John, British Columbia, Watson Lake, Yukon and Whitehorse, Yukon.  CP Air served the airport with Boeing 737-200 jetliners during the 1970s with direct, no change of plane flights to all of the above destinations. Other Canadian Pacific flights into the airport over the years were operated with such twin engine prop aircraft as the Lockheed Lodestar, the Douglas DC-3 and the Convair 240 as well as with the larger, four engine Douglas DC-6B propliner and the Bristol Britannia turboprop.  Another airline which served Fort Nelson during the mid 1970s was International Jetair operating nonstop 
flights several days a week to Inuvik with continuing one stop service to Whitehorse, Yukon flown with Lockheed L-188 Electra turboprop aircraft.  In 1994, Canadian Partner code sharing service on behalf of Canadian Airlines International was being operated with de Havilland Canada DHC-8 Dash 8 turboprops and/or Fokker F28 Fellowship jets to the airport from Vancouver, Edmonton, Grande Prairie and Fort St. John.

See also

Fort Nelson (Parker Lake) Water Aerodrome
Fort Nelson/Gordon Field Airport
Fort Nelson/Mobil Sierra Airport

References

External links

Official site

Certified airports in British Columbia
Northern Rockies Regional Municipality
Airfields of the United States Army Air Forces Air Transport Command in Alaska
Airfields of the United States Army Air Forces in Canada
World War II airfields in Canada
Royal Canadian Air Force stations
Military airbases in British Columbia
Military history of British Columbia